Quinton Crawford (born September 18, 1990) is an American basketball assistant coach of the Dallas Mavericks of the National Basketball Association (NBA). He played college basketball for the Arizona Wildcats, and then started his career as video coordinator and assistant coach.

Early life
Raised in Old Bridge Township, New Jersey, Crawford played prep basketball at Old Bridge High School.

College career
After two years at Middlesex County College, he transferred to the University of Arizona and played for the Wildcats for two seasons (2011–12 and 2012–13), reaching the Sweet Sixteen.

Coaching career
Crawford has served as assistant video coordinator for the Sacramento Kings, Charlotte Hornets and two seasons with the Orlando Magic, under Frank Vogel.

In summer 2019, he was hired by Frank Vogel as assistant coach for the Los Angeles Lakers. Crawford won his first championship when the Lakers defeated the Miami Heat in 6 games of the 2020 NBA Finals.

Before working in the NBA, Crawford spent two seasons (2013–14 and 2014–15) with Pepperdine University men's basketball staff as a graduate manager and video coordinator.

References

1990 births
Living people
American men's basketball players
Arizona Wildcats men's basketball players
Basketball coaches from New Jersey
Basketball players from New Jersey
Los Angeles Lakers assistant coaches
Middlesex County College alumni
Old Bridge High School alumni
People from Old Bridge Township, New Jersey
Pepperdine Waves men's basketball coaches
Sportspeople from Middlesex County, New Jersey